Aleksandr Orekhov may refer to:

 Aleksandr Orekhov (footballer, born 1983), Russian football player
 Aleksandr Orekhov (footballer, born 2002), Russian football player